John Saintignon (born 1965 in Tucson, Arizona) is the former CEO of Interscholastic Licensing Company (ILC). Partnered with Reebok Team, a provider of high quality athletic goods, ILC provides schools, foundations, organizations, federations and individuals a way to self-fund using an online webstore format.

Saintignon was formerly the head coach of Saitama in BJ League in Japan. He also was the head coach of Sitra Club in the Kingdom of Bahrain, and the men's basketball director of basketball and assistant coach of the Oregon State Beavers at Oregon State University.

Early life

Saintignon's college basketball playing career was as a player at University of California, Santa Cruz. He is the all-time leading scorer in university history, and led the entire United States NCAA college basketball with a scoring title, and led the nation in scoring in 1985–86, averaging 31.2 points per game. He later transferred and is a 1990 graduate of the University of California, San Diego with a degree in economics. His professional playing career got started in Barcelona, Spain where he was a starter and then moved to Mexico for his final seasons as a professional athlete, playing in Durango, Zacatecas and Monterrey.  After his professional playing career he returned to Law School where he clerked his first year at Jeffer, Mangles, Butler and Marmaro.  He continued his education at Liberty University, where he earned a Master of Arts degree in 2010 and decided that he would enter the coaching profession.

Coaching career

Saintignon's first coaching position was as a basketball coach at Mar Vista High School in Imperial Beach, California. He served as the varsity head coach for three seasons from 1992 to 1995. He was able to win a championship, which had not been done since 1964.

His next job was at Bonita Vista High School in Chula Vista, as the head coach from 1995 to 2001. He became the school's first coach to win a CIF title in basketball in 1999, finishing that season 30–5.  In 2002 he left to become the head coach with Canyon del Oro High School, getting to the state playoffs in three consecutive seasons. After three seasons with CDO, Saintignon moved to Phoenix, Arizona, to head up the new school, Desert Edge High School.  He helped to build the school program before being asked to join the Pac-10 Conference with Oregon State University.

After two seasons as the director of basketball and Assistant Coach at Oregon State University, Saintignon left to become a head coach of the Culiacan Caballeros. He remained in Culiacan, Sinaloa Mexico for one season, helping that first-year franchise play in the 24-team LNBP, qualify for the playoffs and finish in position 6 overall.

Saintignon returned to NCAA Division II to become lead assistant at Cal State Stanislaus University. He was a member of the Warriors staff from 2008 to 2009.

In 2009–10, Saintignon was asked to restore the glory at the famed Grant High School of Sacramento. He remained with the Pacers for one season.  The Pacers were a force again and qualified for the playoffs and have continued on their path of success.

The same season, Saintignon was hired as the head coach of an overseas professional organization at Sitra Club, in the Kingdom of Bahrain in the Middle East. In two seasons with Sitra Club 2009–2011, he helped the Sailors to the round of 6 in his first season, finishing one game out of the Final Four, in position 5 overall by 1 point.  The next season he led the team to a 6–3 record, which was a 4th-place finish before civil unrest in the country forced an early cancellation of the season due to the Arab Spring.

Saintignon returned to become head coach of Fuerza Guinda of the CIBACOPA League in Nogales, Mexico.  Taking the team to the coveted playoffs in 2012.

A return to become the head coach of Caballeros of Culiacan in the CIBACOPA league in Mexico for a 2nd time.  2016.  Taking the team to the playoffs.

For the 2019–2020 season, Saintignon was asked to guide the Broncos of Saitama in the BLeague in Japan guiding them toward a playoff finish until COVID-19 forced a cancellation of the season within the country.  In 2021-2022 Saintignon has been asked to build a new franchise in the prefecture, Yamaguchi in Japan, the first time ever that Professional Basketball will be played.

As a guest speaker in Bosnia-Herzegovina, Italy, China, Croatia, Bahrain, Mexico, Colombia, Argentina, and the Dominican Republic, Saintignon has earned a reputation as an authority on player development, and has produced several DVDs on improving athletes through individual training (Advanced Guard Workout), as well as attacking on offense with his secondary break philosophy (On the Attack: Mastering the Secondary Break). These are available at Championship Video Productions.

An adjunct professor at UMass Global teaching various Leadership and Diversity and Global Economics subjects since 2019.

He also has been published many times:.
 Author of "Take Your Shot, Make Your Play", available on Amazon, Barnes and Noble, Iuniverse publishing. 2017.
 Author of new book, "Shooting for Impossible", sharing the intimate story of his discovery of his birth parents after being placed for adoption.
 Release date coming in 2021.  www.johnsaintignon.com
 YouTube channel:  Coach John Saintignon-Pursue Your Passion.
 Published articles on offensive ideas for Five-Star Playbook, Wish Publishing
 Developed book, Pass Attack the Complete Offensive System, June 2006
 Published articles on offensive ideas for Five-Star Playbook, Wish Publishing, October 2003 and November 2005 
 Published articles on offensive ideas for Five Star Basketball Coaches Playbook 2, October 2006
 DVD and article published for mensbasketballhoopscoop.com
 DVD produced, 20 Week Fundamental Skill Development, training for youth programs, April 2007
 Developed book, How to Get a College Scholarship, April 2006  
 Included in book, How to Be Like Coach Wooden: Life's Lessons From Basketball’s Greatest Leader by Pat Williams, March 2006

Personal life
Saintignon lives with his wife Angelica and has two sons, Vicente an actor and graduate of USC and Sebastian a Junior at Case Western Reserve University as an engineering student.
He is an avid road cyclist.
He holds a 2nd Degree Black Belt (Nidan) in the martial art of Shorin-ryu Karate.

References

Biography from Oregon State
John Saintignon

1965 births
Living people
Oregon State University people
American men's basketball coaches
Saitama Broncos coaches
Shōrin-ryū practitioners